Dhammika Dasanayake is a Sri Lankan civil servant and lawyer. He is the current Secretary General of Parliament.

Dasanayake was educated at the Royal College Colombo and at the University of Colombo, where he gained a LLB. Taking oaths as an attorney-at-law, he worked in the Foreign Employment Bureau before becoming a State Counsel in the Attorney-General's Department in 1989.

In 1994, he was appointed as the Assistant Secretary General of Parliament and was made Deputy Secretary General of Parliament in 2003. During this time he held many positions in the Commonwealth Parliamentary Association, Inter parliamentary Union and functioned as an advisor for United Nations Development Programme projects. Dasanayake has served as an advisor on parliamentary matters to the United Nations Assistance Mission in Afghanistan. Dhammika is the son of D.M.P.B.Dasanayake, who served as Permanent Secretary to the Ministries of Education, Labour & Budhasasana.

References

External links
Secretary General of Parliament

Living people
Sinhalese lawyers
Sri Lankan Buddhists
Alumni of Royal College, Colombo
Sinhalese civil servants
Alumni of the University of Colombo
Year of birth missing (living people)